Pleurota bicostella is a moth of the family Oecophoridae. It is found in the Palearctic realm.

The wingspan is about 24 mm. The forewings are fuscous, irrorated with whitish; a white costal streak from base to near apex, edged beneath by a brown streak; stigmata black. Hindwings are grey. The larva is pinkish-grey, marbled with brown on sides; dorsal and subdorsal lines brownish; dots blackish; head and plate of 2 yellowish -brown, latter darker-marked.

The moth flies from June to July depending on the location.

The larvae feed on Erica species.

References

External links 
 Pleurota bicostella at UKmoths

Oecophoridae
Moths described in 1759
Moths of Europe
Palearctic Lepidoptera
Taxa named by Carl Alexander Clerck